Ramsharan College of Music is one of the oldest music college in Bishnupur, Bankura, West Bengal. This college was established in 1885 by sangeet guru Ramsharan Mukhopadhyay. It is also considered as oldest music college in India. Initially it was a music school but in 1943, this school was converted as a college. Presently this college offers two courses - one is certificate course of four years duration and another is diploma course of two years duration.

External links
Ramsharan College of Music

Music schools in India
Universities and colleges in Bankura district
Educational institutions established in 1897
1897 establishments in India